Harpenden Rural is a civil parish in the City and District of St Albans in Hertfordshire, England, to the west of Harpenden parish.

The local council is Harpenden Rural Parish Council.

It was created on 15 April 1898 when the former Harpenden parish was split into two parts: Harpenden Urban parish covering the Harpenden Urban District (which was created on the same day), and Harpenden Rural parish which remained in the St Albans Rural District.

The parish includes Kinsbourne Green, and Rothamsted Manor, including the Rothamsted Experimental Station.

References

Civil parishes in Hertfordshire
City of St Albans